The 2014 3 Hours of Fuji was the second round of the 2014 Asian Le Mans Series season. It took place on August 31, 2014 at Fuji Speedway in Oyama, Shizuoka, Japan.

Race result
The race result was as follows. Class winners in bold.

References

External links
 

Fuji
Fuji